The 2002–03 Alabama–Huntsville Chargers ice hockey team represented the University of Alabama in Huntsville in the 2002–03 NCAA Division I men's ice hockey season. The Chargers were coached by Doug Ross who was in his twenty-first season as head coach. The Chargers played their home games in the Von Braun Center and were members of the College Hockey America conference.

Roster

|}

Season

Schedule

|-
!colspan=12 style=""| Regular Season

|-
!colspan=12 style=""| CHA Tournament

Standings

Statistics

Skaters

Goalies

References

Alabama Huntsville
Alabama–Huntsville Chargers men's ice hockey seasons
Ala